Anopinella tariquiae is a species of moth of the family Tortricidae. It is found in Bolivia.

The wingspan is about 14.5 mm. The ground colour of the forewings is white or whitish striped dirty orange. The hindwings are grey.

Etymology
The species name refers to the type locality, Reservation Tariquia in Bolivia.

References

Moths described in 2013
Anopinella
Moths of South America